Amoreuxia is a genus of flowering plants in the achiote family, Bixaceae. It was formerly placed in the family Cochlospermaceae.  Members of the genus are commonly known as yellowshow. They are native to Mexico, Central America, Colombia, Peru, Curaçao, and the southwestern United States.

Species
 Amoreuxia gonzalezii Sprague & L.Riley – Santa Rita Mountain yellowshow - Sonora, Sinaloa, Jalisco, southern Arizona
 Amoreuxia malvifolia A.Gray - Chihuahua, Durango
 Amoreuxia palmatifida Moc. & Sessé ex DC. – Mexican yellowshow - Mexico, Central America, Colombia, Arizona, New Mexico
 Amoreuxia wrightii A.Gray – Wright's yellowshow  - Curaçao, Peru, Chihuahua, Durango, Coahuila, Nuevo León, San Luis Potosí, Tamaulipas, Campeche, Yucatán, Quintana Roo, Campeche, Texas

References

External links

Bixaceae
Malvales genera